Lodè is a comune (municipality) in the Province of Nuoro in the Italian region Sardinia, located about  north of Cagliari and about  northeast of Nuoro.

Lodè borders the following municipalities: Bitti, Lula, Onanì, Padru, Siniscola, Torpè.

Demographic evolution

References

Cities and towns in Sardinia